The National Aeronautics Museum "Brigadier Edmundo Civati Bernasconi" is an Argentine museum located in the city of Morón, Buenos Aires. Established in 1960, the museum is dedicated to the history of aviation, in particular the Argentine Air Force.

Its collection includes some unique aircraft, like the Pulqui I and Pulqui II jet prototypes, the Urubú flying wing glider, the I.Ae. 22 DL trainer, and a Latécoère XXV flown by Antoine de Saint Exupéry.

History 
The museum was created on January 13, 1960, by decree 264/60 of the President of the Republic, its first director and main supporter being Brigadier Edmundo Civatti Bernasconi.

It was initially located at the Aeroparque Jorge Newbery, where the aircraft were displayed in the grounds without protection from the weather. In the 1980s it was proposed to relocate the museum to provide protection to the aircraft, a new facility close to the Ezeiza airport was suggested.
 
In 2001 the museum was relocated to the Morón Airport and Air Base, site of Argentina's first international airport, where hangars were available to protect most of the collection.

In February 2013, a McDonnell Douglas MD-81 (ex-Austral, LV-WFN) was donated to the museum, for restoration and exhibition. This aircraft is notable for having the highest number of flight hours worldwide for its type (70,444 hours in 60,350 cycles) as of March 2012, when it was retired.

Facilities 
The museum is divided in different halls, dedicated to specific themes:

 Motores: displaying aviation engines.
 Malvinas: which includes a Grumman HU-16 Albatross amphibian used in the 1970s to establish a route line between Comodoro Rivadavia and Malvinas (Falkland Islands).
 Antartida: for material used in Antarctica.
 Pioneros: dedicated to Aviation pioneers.
 Torre de control: details the interior of a control tower.
 Pegaso: to host events.
 Icaro: coffee shop.

In addition there is a small gift shop.

Collections

Aircraft 
Aircraft on display include:

Fixed-wing
 Avro Lincoln B.2 B-004, on display as B-010
 Beechcraft AT-11 Kansan
 Blériot XI
 Boeing 737 LV-WTK, donated by Aerolíneas Argentinas
 Bristol Freighter 1A
 Dassault Mirage III versions C, DA (I-002) and EA (I-011)
 de Havilland Beaver
 de Havilland Dove
 DINFIA IA 35b Huanquero A-305
 Douglas A-4 Skyhawk, versions A-4P (C-207) and A-4C (C-322)
 Douglas C-47A-85-DL TA-05, modified as antarctic transport
 Douglas C-54 (cabin)
 English Electric Canberra B Mk.62 B-109, the last one to complete a mission in the Falklands War
 Fairchild 82D LV-FHZ (ex-T-152, msn 66)
 Fairchild Swearingen Metro II (currently under restoration)
 Farman HF.7
 Fiat G.46, post-war military trainer
 Hercules C-130B
 FMA IA 22 DL (c/n 728), trainer built by the Fabrica Militar de Aviones
 FMA IA 27 Pulqui I prototype, the first jet designed and built in Latin America
 FMA IA 33 Pulqui II prototype 5, first swept-wing jet fighter designed and built in Latin America
 FMA IA 41 Urubú, flying wing glider designed by Reimar Horten
 FMA IA 50 Guaraní II F-31 and LQ-JXY
 FMA IA 53 Mamboretá
 FMA IA 58 Pucará
 FMA IA 63 Pampa EX-03 mock-up
 Focke Wulf FW-44J, biplane trainer
 Fokker F.27-600 T-42
 Gloster Meteor F.4 I-041, ex-EE586
 Grumman HU-16B Albatross
 Hiller UH-12E
 Hughes 369HE
 Israeli Aircraft Industries Dagger
 Junkers Ju 52/3m (WNr.4043)
 Latécoère XXV flown by Antoine de Saint-Exupéry for Aeroposta Argentina
 Max-Holste 1521 Broussard
 Morane-Saulnier MS.502
 Morane-Saulnier MS.760 Paris
 North American F-86F Sabre
 Percival Prentice T.1
 Rockwell Aero Commander 500U
 Vickers Viking 1B T-9
 Wright Flyer replica

Rotary wing
 Bell UH-1H
 Boeing Chinook
 Bolkow Bo 105
 Cierva C.30 autogiro
 Sikorsky S-55 helicopter, H-04
 Sikorsky S-61R H-02 used by the Presidential flight

Engines 
 Napier Sabre IIA inline
 Packard DR-980 radial diesel

Other 
Other exhibits include:
 Anasagasti car, used by the Argentine Air Force
 Pampa tractor

Gallery

Aircraft displayed

Other objects displayed

See also
List of aerospace museums

References

Notes

Sources 

 

 Ogden, Bob. Aviation Museums and Collections of the Rest of the World. Tonbridge, Kent, UK: Air-Britain (Historians) Ltd., 2008. .

 Rivas, Santiago. "Pioneers & Prototypes: Pulqui, Pulqui II and IA-37/48." International Air Power Review, Issue 25, 2008, pp. 162–173.  Westport, CT: AIRtime. .

Further reading 
 
 
 
 
 
 
  (Article about Pulqui I restoration and history, and when the MNA reopened at Moron)

External links

 
 Museum on Argentine Air Force (archived, 2 Jun 2008)
 Museum news official blog site  
 pictorial

Museums in Buenos Aires
Argentine Air Force
Air force museums
Aviation in Argentina
Military and war museums in Argentina